Gabriel Cevallos García (Cuenca, January 6, 1913 - March 16, 2004) was an Ecuadorian writer, historian, professor, and philosopher.

He was the rector of the University of Cuenca from 1964 to 1968 and founder, professor, and dean of the Faculty of Philosophy and Letters of the university.

He taught for some years at the University of Puerto Rico at Mayagüez, where he settled in 1969 to work as a teacher. He was a member of the Ecuadorian Academy of Language and the National Academy of History.

He was awarded the Ecuadorian National Prize in Literature "Premio Eugenio Espejo" in 1988 by the President of Ecuador.

He died at the age of 91 in Tampa, Florida.

Works
 Reflexiones sobre la historia del Ecuador
 Teoría del descubrimiento de América
 De aquí y de allá
 Ensayo sobre arte
 Pensamiento histórico ecuatoriano

References

1913 births
2004 deaths
Ecuadorian male writers